Michaela Balcová (born 30 May 1995) is a Slovak Paralympic boccia player who competes in the BC4 category. In the 2016 Summer Paralympics she won the gold medal in mixed pairs with Robert Durkovic and Samuel Andrejčík. Balcová and Andrejčík also won the gold medal at the 2020 Summer Paralympics alongside Martin Streharsky.

References

1995 births
Living people
Sportspeople from Poprad
Boccia players at the 2016 Summer Paralympics
Boccia players at the 2020 Summer Paralympics
Paralympic gold medalists for Slovakia
Paralympic boccia players of Slovakia
Medalists at the 2016 Summer Paralympics
Medalists at the 2020 Summer Paralympics
Paralympic medalists in boccia